Tebbutt is a lunar impact crater that is located near the southwestern edge of Mare Crisium. It was named after Australian astronomer John Tebbutt. It was formerly designated Picard G before being named by the IAU, and lies south of the crater Picard. To the north of Tebbutt, but farther east than Picard, is the flooded Lick.

This crater has a worn and damaged outer rim along its eastern half, but the rim is all but nonexistent on the western face, being little more than a pair of curved ridges beneath the surface. Lava flows have overflowed this western rim and submerged the interior, leaving a relatively level and featureless interior. A small craterlet marks the southern end of the interior floor, and several tiny craters mark the surviving rim.

References

External links

 LTO-62A4 Tebbutt — L&PI topographic map

Impact craters on the Moon